Greendale is a town in central Victoria, Australia in the Shire of Moorabool local government area,  west north west of the state capital, Melbourne.

Prior to European settlement, the area around Greendale was inhabited by the Kutung, the Wathourung, the Wurunjeri, the Jaara and the Ngurelban indigenous tribes.  When European settlers arrived in the area in the late 1830s conflict developed between the two groups.  The early settlers noticed a variety of native flora and fauna including kangaroos, bandicoots, dingoes and two species of quoll.

Greendale Post Office opened on 1 January 1867.

John Cain, Premier of Victoria, was born in Greendale in 1882.

References

Towns in Victoria (Australia)